Hank Bull D.F.A. (born 1949) is a Canadian artist, curator, organizer and arts administrator.

Life and work
Hank Bull was born in Calgary, Alberta. HIs father was an Anglican minister and his mother a weaver. He was raised in Ontario and Nova Scotia with three brothers. By the age of 14 he had firmly decided to pursue an art career. He spent the better part of 1968 in Europe, visiting art museums, experiencing the student movement and exploring the music scene. On his return to Toronto he enrolled in the New School of Art, studying under Nobuo Kubota and Robert Markle. He played in bands and held a variety of jobs, working for the railroad, picking tobacco, tending bar. In 1973, he moved to Vancouver where he joined the recently formed Western Front Society.

There he met Kate Craig., Eric Metcalfe, Glenn Lewis, Martin Bartlett and Patrick Ready, who would all be close collaborators. He and Craig became partners in life and art and were married until her death in 2002. Hank and Patrick formed the artistic duo HP, producing radio shows, shadow theatre and other projects. A formative experience for Bull was being able to work with many of the artists who visited the Western Front, including Al Neil, Margaret Dragu, General Idea, Marshalore, Clive Robertson and Robert Filliou. Anthony Braxton, Leo Smith, Steve Lacy and Mal Waldron were among the many musicians whose concerts at the Front left a deep impression.

In 1980 Craig and Bull embarked on an extended trip around the world, meeting artists, learning and performing in Japan, Indonesia, India, Cameroon, France, Austria and Croatia (Yugoslavia). Lasting relationships were established with video artist Ko Nakajima (Tokyo), dalang I Wayan Wija (Sukawati, Bali), musician Mama Ohandja (Yaounde), visual artists Sanja Iveković and Dalibor Martinis (Zagreb) and Heidi Grundmann and Robert Adrian (Vienna).

After this transformative experience of the globalization of culture, Bull devoted much energy in the 1980s and 90s to building networks between artists, not only internationally but across Canada and in Vancouver. He played an active role in developing ANNPAC (the Association of National Non-Profit Artist-run Centres) and was a co-founder of PAARC (the Pacific Association of Artist-Run Centres). Throughout the 80s and 90s he was a regular contributor to an informal collective of artists around the world who were experimenting with the use telecommunications technology, in particular slowscan video, transmission of text, and fax. He continued his collaborations with artists and has worked with Mona Hatoum, Emmett Williams, Gábor and Verushka Bódy, Antoni Muntadas, Tari Ito, Santiago Bose, Heri Dono, Tetsuo Kogawa and William S Burroughs.

In the early 1990s he became involved with investigations into the relationship of art and ecology. The Furry Creek Art Centre was an artist-in-residence project developed with Japanese artist Kei Tsuji. Along similar lines, a series of conferences organized by Littoral (Lancashire UK) enabled artists to work directly with sheep farmers and others living in agricultural communities.

In 1998, with Zheng Shengtian, Bull organized the Jiangnan Project, a dozen exhibitions in Vancouver devoted to telling the story of modern and contemporary art in the Shanghai region of China. The success of Jiangnan led to the creation of Centre A, the Vancouver International Centre for Contemporary Asian Art. As director of Centre A until 2010, Bull worked with curators Steven Tong, Sadira Rodrigues, Alice Ming Wai Jim and Makiko Hara to produce over 100 exhibition projects by Canadian and international artists.

In 2015, a survey exhibition, "Hank Bull: Connexion"  was organized by Confederation Centre Art Gallery, Charlottetown, curated by Joni Low and Pan Wendt. Based on Bull's personal art collection and his extensive archive of props, costumes, videos, books and correspondence, the exhibition travelled to five public galleries across Canada.

In 2017 and 2019, Bull held solo exhibitions of recent work at Franc Gallery in Vancouver.

Since 2014, he has been a Trustee of the Vancouver Art Gallery, where he chairs the Governance and Nominations Committee.

Hank Bull is married to Carey Schaefer, also an artist.

Exhibitions
Bull's work has been included in numerous exhibitions, including the Venice Biennale (1986), documenta (1987) Ars Electronica (1989) and the Leipzig Medienbiennale (1994).

Collections
Bull's work is included in a number of private and public collections, including the National Gallery of Canada, the Museum of Modern Art New York, the Art Gallery of Nova Scotia, le Musée d'art contemporain de Montréal, the Burnaby Art Gallery and the Video Data Bank in Chicago.

Publications 
Connexion, 159 pages, Confederation Centre Art Gallery, Charlottetown, 2015.

Awards 
In 2014, Bull received an honorary doctorate from the Emily Carr University of Art and Design.

See also 
Storm Bay (British Columbia)

References

Canadian multimedia artists
Artists from Calgary
1949 births
Living people